Frank J. Pino (June 5, 1909 – November 10, 2007) was an American lawyer and politician from New York.

Life
He was born on June 5, 1909, in Brooklyn, New York City, the son of Joseph Pino and Angela (Merlino) Pino. He attended Public School No. 80, and graduated from Erasmus Hall High School. He graduated from St. John's University School of Law, and practiced law in Brooklyn. In 1938, he married Concetta LoRe, and they had three daughters.

Pino was a member of the New York State Assembly from 1945 to 1955, sitting in the 165th, 166th, 167th, 168th, 169th and 170th New York State Legislatures. He resigned his seat on October 6, 1955, to run for the State Senate seat vacated by the appointment of Louis L. Friedman to the New York Supreme Court.

Pino was a member of the New York State Senate from 1956 to 1963, sitting in the 170th, 171st, 172nd, 173rd and 174th New York State Legislatures. In November 1963, he was elected to the New York Supreme Court.

He was a Justice of the Supreme Court from 1964 to 1979, and a Senior Justice from 1980 to 1981. In 1975, St. John's University conferred an honorary degree of LL.D. on him.

In 1989, he moved to Rossmoor, Middlesex County, New Jersey, and died there on November 10, 2007. He was buried at the Holy Cross Burial Park Mausoleum in South Brunswick.

Sources

1909 births
2007 deaths
Politicians from Brooklyn
Democratic Party New York (state) state senators
Democratic Party members of the New York State Assembly
People from Monroe Township, Middlesex County, New Jersey
St. John's University School of Law alumni
20th-century American politicians
Erasmus Hall High School alumni